Cargotec Oyj (trading internationally as Cargotec Corporation) is a Finnish company that makes cargo handling machinery for ships, ports, terminals and local distribution.

Cargotec was formed in June 2005 when Kone Corporation was split into two companies to be listed: Cargotec and new Kone. After the split, Kone Corporation's container handling (Kalmar Global), load handling (HIAB) and marine cargo handling (MacGregor) business units formed Cargotec. However, the businesses within Cargotec have much longer histories and have been formed through a series of mergers and acquisitions over several decades.

At the end of 2022, Cargotec had approximately 11,500 personnel working in over 100 countries.

Cargotec's major shareholders are the heirs of Pekka Herlin. Current (since April 27, 2022) Chairman of the Cargotec's Board of Directors is Jaakko Eskola, replacing long-term Chair Ilkka Herlin in 2022.

Business areas
Around 2010, Cargotec prepared a separation and possible listing of MacGregor in Singapore. Due to market conditions and focusing on integration of major acquisitions, Cargotec's Board of Directors decided in October 2013 to delay the listing.

History
Cargotec was formed in June 2005 when Kone Corporation was split into two companies to be listed: Cargotec and new Kone. After the split, Kone Corporation's marine cargo handling (MacGregor), container handling (Kalmar Industries AB) and load handling (HIAB and Moffett, the latter being based in Ireland and acquired in 2000) business units formed Cargotec. However, the businesses within Cargotec have much longer histories and they have been formed through a series of mergers and acquisitions during several decades.

Cargotec's Kalmar business area started to take shape in 1997 when Partek Corporation acquired the Finnish state-owned Sisu Ltd including its terminal tractor business. During the same year, Partek acquired a major shareholding in Kalmar Industries Ltd, a container handling equipment producer.

The foundations of Cargotec's Hiab business area were laid in 1977 when Partek Corporation bought Multilift Group. In 1985, Partek acquired Hydrauliska Industrier Ltd (HIAB) and Jonsered forestry cranes. A couple of years later Partek strengthened its forestry crane expertise by acquiring that particular business line from Fiskars. Several business acquisitions in 2000 enforced the load handling business. In 2004, the name HIAB was taken into use for the whole load handling business in Cargotec.

MacGregor originates from England where it started to serve shipping companies and shipyards in 1937. The marine cargo business of the company in a broader meaning started in 1983 when MacGregor merged with the Finnish Navire. In 1993 Incentive acquired MacGregor-Navire and merged it with Hägglunds Marine. In 1998, the majority of MacGregor was sold to Industri Kapital. In 2005, Cargotec bought MacGregor International AB, the global marine cargo flow solutions provider, to strengthen the company's cargo handling offering. Several mergers and acquisitions have taken place since to further strengthen MacGregor.

In 2011, Cargotec acquired Navis, a US based terminal operator systems provider from Zebra Technologies for $190 million. Cargotec sold Navis in 2021 to technology investment company Accel-KKR for €380 million. 

On October 1, 2020, Cargotec and Konecranes announced that they have agreed to a merger. The deal will require two thirds of the shareholders and is expected to complete in the fourth quarter of 2021. The merger was cancelled in March 2022 after the UK Competition & Markets Authority blocked the merger between the companies.

Ownership
The major shareholders of Cargotec are Pekka Herlin's heirs Ilkka Herlin (Wipunen Varainhallinta Oy), Niklas Herlin's estate (Mariatorp Oy) and Ilona Herlin (since 31 Aug 2015 Pivosto Oy) each managing over 22% of votes.

References

External link

Companies established in 2005
Companies listed on Nasdaq Helsinki
Manufacturing companies based in Helsinki
Truck manufacturers of Finland
Forklift truck manufacturers
Crane manufacturers
Finnish brands
2005 establishments in Finland